The cougnou or bread of Jesus is a bread baked during Christmas time and is typical of the southern Low Countries.

It has various names according to the location:
 Coquille in Romance Flanders (Lille and Tournai),
 Cougnolle or similar in ancient Hainaut (Cognolle in Mons),
 Cougnou in Walloon-speaking places like Charleroi, Andenne, Namur, Dinant but also in Ardennes, in the Gaume, in Brussels etc.
 Quéniolle in Cambraisis,
 Volaeren, Folards or Folarts in West Flemish-speaking French Flanders like Dunkirk.

The bread of Jesus is a sweet bread formed like a baby Jesus. It is made with flour, eggs, milk, yeast, raisins and sugar. Usually, it is given to children on Christmas and St. Martin's Day and usually enjoyed with a cup of hot chocolate. This bread seems to have originated in ancient Hainaut but the bread of Jesus is now spread throughout the southern Low Countries. It is usually decorated, also differently across the provinces: with terracotta circles (called Rond(s)) in Hainaut and Romance Flanders, with incisions in Cambraisis, elsewhere it is with flowers, sugar...

The Ronds were traditionally made with clay coming from Baudour but are now made with plaster.

See also
 King cake

References

External links
 

Sweet breads
Yeast breads
Brioches
Christmas food
Belgian cuisine
French pastries